The 2016 season saw the return of Botafogo de Futebol e Regatas to the Campeonato Brasileiro Série A, after spending 2015 in Série B.

Background
After a poor 2014 season saw Botafogo relegated for only the second time in their history, Botafogo comfortably won the 2015 Série B.

Match results

Legend

Preseason

Campeonato Carioca

Group stage

Taça Guanabara

Final stage

a - Vasco da Gama won the final 2–1 on aggregate

Copa do Brasil

Campeonato Brasileiro Série A

Squad statistics
Statistics accurate as at the end of the 2016 season

Kits

Botafogo began the year wearing uniforms manufactured by Puma.

Awards
 Campeonato Carioca Revelação [Young Player of the Year]: Ribamar

Venues
As a result of the 2016 Summer Olympics being held in Rio de Janeiro, Botafogo was not able to access their regular home of Estádio Olímpico João Havelange (known as the Estádio Nilton Santos for Botafogo games) during 2016. During the Rio State Championship, Botafogo hosted games at the Estádio São Januário in Rio de Janeiro city; the Estádio de Los Larios in Duque de Caxias, Rio de Janeiro; the Estádio Kléber Andrade in Cariacica, Espírito Santo; the Estádio Mário Helênio in Juiz de Fora, Minas Gerais; and the Maracanã Stadium in Rio de Janeiro city. Botafogo's home matches in the first two rounds of the Copa do Brasil were hosted at the Estádio de Los Larios.

Prior to the commencement of the Campeonato Brasileiro, Botafogo and Associação Atlética Portuguesa agreed a deal to play at the Estádio Luso Brasileiro in Ilha do Governador in Rio de Janeiro city with the stadium being known as "Arena Botafogo". Prior to matches being played at the stadium, temporary seating and improvements to the pitch were required. While these renovations took place, matches were played at the Estádio Raulino de Oliveira in Volta Redonda, Rio de Janeiro; the Estádio Nacional Mané Garrincha in Brasília; and the Estádio Mário Helênio in Juiz de Fora, Minas Gerais.

References

Sources
 Botafogo FR on Soccerway

Botafogo de Futebol e Regatas seasons
Brazilian football clubs 2016 season